KVPS-LD, virtual and VHF digital channel 8, is a low-powered NewsNet-affiliated television station licensed to Indio, California, United States. The station is owned by Esther Arenas. KVPS-LD's transmitter is located on Edom Hill in Cathedral City.

History
The station was founded August 19, 1998 as K63CG. It aired Spanish-language programming, mostly televangelist Christian shows and Mexican music videos. Its callsign was changed in 2000 to K08MX, and in 2002 to KVPS-LP.

KVPS-LP went dark on April 10, 2015; its license was canceled on February 16, 2017. The station's license was reinstated on July 13, 2018; it had flash-cut to digital and became KVPS-LD.

Digital channel

References

External links
 

VPS-LD
Indio, California
NewsNet affiliates
Television channels and stations established in 1998
1998 establishments in California
Low-power television stations in the United States